Narberth is a borough in Montgomery County, Pennsylvania, United States. It is one of many neighborhoods on the historic Philadelphia Main Line.  The population was 4,282 at the 2010 census.

History
Narberth is located on a parcel of land originally deeded to Edward Rees (which later became “Prees” and eventually “Price”), who arrived from Wales in 1682.  A portion of this original tract became the  farm of Edward R. Price, who founded Elm as a Quaker-friendly town in 1881. The town name changed to Narberth in 1893, and Narberth was incorporated in 1895.  In 1995, the borough celebrated its 100th birthday with a year-long celebration.

The Narbrook Park Historic District was listed on the National Register of Historic Places in 2003.

Demographics

As of the 2010 census, the borough was 90.4% White, 1.9% Black or African American, 4.4% Asian, 0.1% Native Hawaiian, and 2.7% were two or more races. 2.4% of the population were of Hispanic or Latino ancestry.

As of the census of 2000, there were 4,233 people, 1,904 households, and 1,037 families residing in the borough. The population density was 8,571.7 people per square mile (3,335.4/km2). There were 1,981 housing units at an average density of 4,011.5 per square mile (1,561.0/km2). The racial makeup of the borough was 95.23% White, 1.18% African American, 0.12% Native American, 2.27% Asian, 0.14% from other races, and 1.06% from two or more races. Hispanic or Latino of any race were 1.39% of the population.

There were 1,904 households, out of which 26.3% had children under the age of 18 living with them, 44.9% were married couples living together, 7.8% had a female householder with no husband present, and 45.5% were non-families. 37.2% of all households were made up of individuals, and 10.2% had someone living alone who was 65 years of age or older. The average household size was 2.22 and the average family size was 3.02.

In the borough, the population was spread out, with 22.3% under the age of 18, 5.2% from 18 to 24, 34.9% from 25 to 44, 24.9% from 45 to 64, and 12.7% who were 65 years of age or older. The median age was 39.6 years. For every 100 females there were 85.1 males. For every 100 females age 18 and over, there were 81.0 males.

The median income for a household in the borough was $79,822. Males had a median income of $59,076 versus $41,518 for females. The per capita income for the borough was $35,165. About 2.6% of families and 3.4% of the population were below the poverty line, including 2.5% of those under age 18 and 6.4% of those age 65 or over. 

The borough has many square blocks of fine old Victorian homes and apartment buildings, and most its families live north and west of downtown areas, extending north along Montgomery Avenue to North Wynnewood Avenue.

Geography

Narberth is an enclave surrounded by Lower Merion Township, close to the western edge of the city of Philadelphia. It is part of the Philadelphia Main Line, a string of leafy, picturesque suburbs with quaint Welsh names extending west from Philadelphia along the old Pennsylvania Railroad's "main line" from Merion through Ardmore, Bryn Mawr, Villanova, Devon and Wayne among other towns and municipalities. Narberth is unique among those locations in that it is fairly enclosed; no major thoroughfares run through the town, but Montgomery Avenue runs northwest–southeast along the borough's northern border.

Because of its small size, many of Narberth's shopping and recreational facilities are within walking distance of residents' houses. SEPTA's "Main Line" railroad tracks separate North Side from South Side. Narberth is mostly a residential community, with a central business district along Haverford, Narberth, Forrest, and Essex Avenues.  The borough is bordered by the towns of Wynnewood, Pennsylvania, Merion, and Penn Valley, Pennsylvania.

Climate
The climate in this area is characterized by hot, humid summers and generally mild to cool winters.  According to the Köppen Climate Classification system, Narberth has a humid subtropical climate, abbreviated "Cfa" on climate maps.

Average monthly temperatures range from 32.2 °F in January to 77.2 °F in July.

Shopping and entertainment
Narberth's business district has a variety of small, generally independent businesses.  Some have been there for decades, including the American Family Market, The Cheese Company and Real Pizza.  In recent years, many new businesses have opened, including Sweet Mabel Store and Studio, the Narberth Bookshop, Le Petit Mitron (a French bakery), Village Treats, and DEA Strength Training.  Narberth also has an independent movie theater located in its downtown.  Many borough businesses belong to the Narberth Business Association, which promotes the town as a shopping destination and also puts on occasional events, including the Spring Sidewalk Sale and the Narberth Dickens Festival.

Recreation
The Borough of Narberth maintains two recreational facilities: The Narberth Playground and the Sabine Avenue Playground. The Narberth Playground has two basketball courts, three tennis courts, a field area, a junior basketball court (once volleyball), and a playground for younger children. The Sabine Avenue Tot Lot, on the grounds of the former Narberth Elementary School, is the smaller of the two and was recently renovated with new playground equipment. In addition, the borough sponsors a Fall soccer program, a Spring baseball program, a Summer basketball program, and many other sports and recreation activities.

Politics and government

Narberth has a city manager form of government with a mayor and a seven-member Borough Council.  The Mayor is Andrea Deutsch, a Democrat.  The members of Borough Council, all of whom are Democrats, are Fred Bush (president), Michele Paninopoulos (vice president), Barbara Fortner, Rob McGreevey, Cyndi Rickards, Bob Weisbord and Ira Winston. The Borough Manager is Samantha Bryant. The Solicitor is John Walko.

The borough is part of the Fourth Congressional District (represented by Rep. Madeleine Dean). In the US Senate, the Borough is represented by Senator Bob Casey, Jr. (senior senator) and Pat Toomey (junior senator). In the Pennsylvania General Assembly, the Borough is part of the 148th State House District (represented by Rep. Mary Jo Daley) and the 17th State Senate District (represented by Sen. Amanda Cappelletti).

Education
Residents of Narberth are served by the Lower Merion School District. Borough children attend either Merion Elementary or Belmont Hills Elementary schools, Bala Cynwyd Middle or Welsh Valley Middle schools, and either Lower Merion High School or Harriton High School. Religious schools in the immediate vicinity include the private Waldron Mercy Academy and Merion Mercy Academy Catholic schools, the parish Saint Margaret's Elementary Catholic School, and Torah Academy in nearby Wynnewood. Nearby private schools include Friends' Central School on City Avenue, the French International School in Bala Cynwyd, Gladwyne Montessori in Gladwyne, the girls schools Agnes Irwin in Rosemont, Baldwin in Bryn Mawr, the boys school The Haverford School in Haverford, and coeducational Episcopal Academy in Newtown Square and Shipley School in Bryn Mawr.

Narberth is close to Saint Joseph's University, which occupies an increasingly large campus in nearby Merion on City Avenue. Haverford College, Bryn Mawr College, Villanova University, Cabrini College, Eastern University, and Rosemont College are nearby to the west, while the University of Pennsylvania, Drexel University, Thomas Jefferson University, Philadelphia University, and Temple University are nearby to the east in the City of Philadelphia.

Transportation 

No numbered highways directly serve Narberth. Main streets traversing the borough include Narberth Avenue, Wynnewood Road and Haverford Avenue. The nearest state highways are Pennsylvania Route 23, U.S. Route 30, U.S. Route 1, and Interstate 76, all traversing the surrounding township of Lower Merion. 

 
The Narberth Train Station, the third stop on SEPTA's Paoli/Thorndale Line to Center City Philadelphia, is located on Haverford Avenue in downtown Narberth. These railroad tracks run through the Philadelphia Main Line, the collective western suburbs of Philadelphia where the railroad westward was originally established. Towns on the lower Main Line adjacent to Narberth include Overbrook, Merion, Wynnewood, Ardmore, Haverford, and Bryn Mawr. The SEPTA Route 105 bus runs along the length of Lancaster Avenue on the Main Line, and the SEPTA Route 44 bus supplements the trains for service between Narberth and Center City Philadelphia. South Wynnewood is served by the SEPTA's Norristown High Speed Line that connects the southern Main Line suburbs with Norristown to the north and west and SEPTA's 69th Street Transportation Center, where there is a connection to the Market-Frankford Line rapid transit train service into Center City and beyond into Frankford north of Center City along the Delaware River.

Hospitals 

Nearby Wynnewood is also home to one of the three principal teaching hospitals that serve Philadelphia's Main Line. Along with the eponymous Bryn Mawr and Paoli Memorial hospitals, Lankenau Medical Center, on Lancaster Pike (Route 30) in Wynnewood near the Overbrook border, has traditionally been affiliated with either Jefferson or Hahnemann (now Drexel) colleges of medicine and is always (with Bryn Mawr and Paoli) on the list of the nation's top community hospitals. Saunders House, a rehabilitation facility, can be found on Lankenau's premises, as is a large and busy medical office building that is home to many of the private practices of the hospital's attending physicians.

Press
Local events are covered by The Main Line Times and the newer Main Line Life print newspapers.

Notable people

 Bert Bell spent his final years in Narberth, and there is a plaque in his honor in downtown Narberth outside the location of the restaurant where he usually conducted NFL business
 Margaret Harshaw grew up in Narberth
 John Hickenlooper of Colorado was born and raised in Narberth
 Pug Southerland was born in Narberth

References

External links

 

Philadelphia Main Line
Populated places established in 1847
Boroughs in Montgomery County, Pennsylvania
1847 establishments in Pennsylvania